Loryma aridalis is a species of snout moth in the genus Loryma. It was described by Rothschild in 1913. It is found in Algeria.

References

Moths described in 1913
Pyralini
Endemic fauna of Algeria
Moths of Africa